Robert Wischusen (born October 1, 1971) is an American sports commentator who is currently a hockey, college football and basketball voice for ESPN and the radio voice announcer for the New York Jets on WEPN-FM.

Biography

Early life and career
Wischusen grew up in New Jersey, and attended Union Catholic Regional High School in Scotch Plains. He then attended Boston College and began his sportscasting experience on WZBC, the school's 1000-watt FM radio station broadcasting to the Greater Boston area. Classmates and fellow broadcasters at WZBC included Joe Tessitore and Jon Sciambi, both of whom also went on to become successful sports announcers.

After graduating from B.C. in 1993, Wischusen went to work in sports radio at WQAM in Miami. After leaving the station he settled in New York, where he has worked since.

WFAN and WABC
Originally, Wischusen worked for WFAN as a reporter and update host for the station's sports news flashes that air every twenty minutes. During his time at WFAN he began working on the station's Jets coverage, hosting the pregame, halftime, and postgame shows. When WFAN lost the rights to the Jets after the 1998 season, Wischusen followed the coverage to WABC. In 2002, he became the play-by-play voice for the Jets on the station after Howard David departed the team for a job in Miami. During his time with the Jets, he has worked with Dave Jennings and Marty Lyons as his color commentators.

ESPN
Wischusen began working for ESPN in 2006 as a secondary commentator for college football and basketball, usually calling games from mid-major conferences such as the MAC or WAC.  In 2009, Wischusen called ACC college football regional action on ABC at 3:30(ET) with Brian Griese.  For the 2010 college football season, Wischusen was once again paired with  Griese, this time calling games for the Noon(ET) ESPN2 broadcast. Wischusen is currently calling with Dan Orlovsky.

In 2021, Andrew Marchand of the New York Post reported that Wischusen would start calling play-by-play for the NHL on ESPN.

Other duties
In addition to those duties, Wischusen is a substitute announcer for WEPN and MSG's coverage of the Knicks when the announcer Mike Breen is unavailable due to other commitments. Wischusen also announced for the New York Dragons AFL team during its first season alongside former Jet Greg Buttle with whom he currently calls games for the New York Jets Wischusen also served as a field reporter for NBC's coverage of Game 1 of the 2000 American League Division Series between the New York Yankees and Oakland Athletics. In 2010, Wischusen teams with Sean McDonough to anchor coverage of the U.S. Open golf tournament on ESPN Radio.

References 

1971 births
Living people
American sports radio personalities
American television sports announcers
ArenaBowl broadcasters
Arena football announcers
Association football commentators
Boston College alumni
College basketball announcers in the United States
College football announcers
Golf writers and broadcasters
Major League Baseball broadcasters
National Basketball Association broadcasters
National Football League announcers
National Hockey League broadcasters
New York Jets announcers
New York Knicks announcers
New York Rangers announcers
New York Red Bulls
People from Union County, New Jersey
Union Catholic Regional High School alumni
Women's college basketball announcers in the United States
Women's National Basketball Association announcers